Powter may refer to:

Daniel Powter (born 1971), Canadian musician
Seán Powter (born 1997), Irish Gaelic footballer
Susan Powter (born 1957), Australian motivational speaker
 An archaic variant spelling of pewter